The Mud Springs Station Archaeological District, which includes the Mud Springs Pony Express Station Site, near Dalton, Nebraska, has significance dating to the mid-19th century.  The Pony Express station at Mud Springs, staffed by U.S. soldiers,  was attacked by Lakota, Cheyenne, and Arapaho tribesmen during February 4–6, 1865, in what became known as the Battle of Mud Springs.

In 1966, the site of the Pony Express station was a  plot. It has also been designated Nebraska historic site 25MO72.

Brief History

Mud Springs Station, a Native American territory in the olden times, served as a Pony Express site in 1860-61. It was named after the springs found at the opening of  a canyon that divided Lodge Pole Creek and North Platte River Valleys,  Dalton, Nebraska. The station served travelers en route the dry and arid trail from the Lodge Pole Creek to Oregon.

In 1859, Mud Springs Station saw the coming of crude houses and a stage station for coach service, the movement called as Pony Express. But its life proved short-lived and in, 1861, abruptly ceased. But, as a legacy, a transcontinental telegraph station was established at Mud Springs Station and a daily stage coach service continued its service.

The telegraph station, that served till 1876 proved a savior for Mud Spring Station, when an attack by the Sioux and Cheyenne Indians in the Battle of Mud Springs was thwarted by a SOS telegraph sent to US troops and the subsequent arrival of reinforcements to counter the attack. Today, as the last vestige of the Mud Spring Station, a stone monument, inlaid with a bronze Pony Express plaque, stands at the historic site.

Currently, listed on the National Register of Historic Places, originally, the Pony Express Station site was donated in 1939 to the Nebraska State Historical Society, by the then site-owner, Mrs. Scherer.

See also
Battle of Rush Creek

References

External links 
 Mud Springs Pony Express Station Site - National Park Service, history and visiting information
More photos of the Mud Springs station site at Wikimedia Commons
Fort Laramie National Historic Site Hosts Program on Mud Spring and Rush Creek Battles,  Gering Citizen, 2011-07-14

Archaeological sites on the National Register of Historic Places in Nebraska
Buildings and structures completed in 1856
Buildings and structures in Morrill County, Nebraska
Tourist attractions in Morrill County, Nebraska
Monuments and memorials in Nebraska
Historic districts on the National Register of Historic Places in Nebraska
National Register of Historic Places in Morrill County, Nebraska